Matiaha Martin (born 3 June 1992) is a New Zealand rugby union player who currently plays as a lock for  in New Zealand's domestic Mitre 10 Cup.

Senior career

After coming through the ranks of Counties Manukau's under-18, B and development teams, Martin finally cracked the senior squad in 2016 Mitre 10 Cup. He played all 11 of the Steelers games during the campaign, 9 of these appearances were from the start.

He was drafted into the  squad for the 2017 Super Rugby season shortly before the start of the season.

References

1992 births
Living people
New Zealand rugby union players
Rugby union locks
Counties Manukau rugby union players
Rugby union players from Hamilton, New Zealand
Chiefs (rugby union) players
Blues (Super Rugby) players